Montanaro is a comune (municipality) in the Metropolitan City of Turin in the Italian region Piedmont, located about 20 km northeast of Turin.

Montanaro borders on the following municipalities: Caluso, Foglizzo, San Benigno Canavese, and Chivasso.

Twin towns — sister cities
Montanaro is twinned with:

  Chiusa Sclafani, Italy

References

Cities and towns in Piedmont